Johann Hermann Baas [ba:s] (24 October 1838 – 10 November 1909) was a German physician best known for his writings on medical history.

Baas was born in Bechtheim, in Rhenish Hesse, and studied medicine at the University of Giessen. He graduated in 1860, and practiced medicine and ophthalmology in various towns of Rhenish Hesse. He undertook research into a number of areas of medicine, including hearing, but became best known for his influential histories of medicine. He died in Worms in 1909.

Literary works 
 Grundriss der Geschichte der Medizin und des heilenden Standes, 1876
 Die geschichtliche Entwicklung des ärztlichen Stands und der medizinischen Wissenschaften, 1896

References

External links
 , 1889 translation by Henry Ebenezer Handerson of the Grundriss, at Google Books

1838 births
1909 deaths
People from Alzey-Worms
German medical historians
19th-century German physicians
University of Giessen alumni
German male non-fiction writers